Sinisen syvyys ('The deepness of blue') is a 1987 album by Finnish gospel musician Jaakko Löytty, released by Profile Records.

Track listing
All words and music by Jaakko Löytty, except as indicated
Arrangements by the band, vocals arranged by Jaakko Löytty.

Side one

Side two

Musicians
Jaakko Löytty – vocals, acoustic guitar
Jouko Laivuori – keyboards
Kari Paukola – guitar
Mikko Löytty – bass
Sakari Löytty – drums, marimba

Background vocals:
Taru Hallama, Päivi Vanhatalo, Harri Rantanen, Mikko Löytty, Jouko Laivuori.

Production
Timo Toikka, Sakari Löytty, Seppo Vanhatalo – mixing
Tom Linkopuu – cover image
Matti Karppinen – photograph

Jaakko Löytty albums
1987 albums